Kokrajhar Govt. College is an educational institution located in Kokrajhar, Assam, India. It was established on 16 August 1959. Though it started only with an arts stream, the science stream was introduced in 1964 and was brought under deficit system in 1972.

Theme
Kokrajhar Govt. College believes in discipline and excellence and has been quite successful in maintaining this over the years. A very significant one-liner is embedded in the cover of the Kokrajhar Govt. College prospectus "A lesson missed is missed forever".

Affiliating university and council
The college was affiliated to Gauhati University for degree level until 2019-20 now college is affiliated to Bodoland University and the Assam Higher Secondary Education Council for Higher Secondary level.

Courses
Kokrajhar Govt. College offers the following courses:

Regular Courses

Two years HS Science
Subjects offered in the science stream are:

Physics
Chemistry
Mathematics
Botany
Zoology
Statistics 
Computer Science

Two years HS Arts
The arts stream contains the following subjects:

Political Science
Economics
Education
History
Geography
Philosophy
English
Bodo
Assamese
Bengali
Hindi
Sociology
Philosophy

Three years degree (TDC) courses

Three years B.Sc.
Honours subjects offered in B.Sc. are:

Physics
Chemistry
Mathematics
Botany
Zoology
Computer science
Statistics

Three years BA
Major subjects offered in the BA are:

Assamese
Bengali
Bodo
Economics
Education
English
Geography
Hindi
History
Philosophy
Political science
Sociology

MIL subjects offered include:
Bodo
Assamese
Bengali
Hindi

Certificate Courses

Three months certificate courses offered are:
Computer proficiency
Bodo

Diploma Courses
Three months diploma course in translation proficiency.

Post Graduate Courses

Science:- Mathematics, Chemistry
Arts:- Assamese, English

References

External links
 Official website

Universities and colleges in Assam
Kokrajhar
Colleges affiliated to Gauhati University
Educational institutions established in 1959
1959 establishments in Assam